Edeline may refer to:

People
 Edeline Lee, Canadian fashion designer

Places
 Edeline Islands, Australia
 Bosc-Édeline, France

Other
 Lady Edeline, Australian ship